David McCulloch (5 October 1912 – 21 June 1979) was a Scottish footballer who played for several Scottish and English clubs in the 1930s, most notably Heart of Midlothian, Brentford and Derby County. He also represented Scotland at full international level.

Biography 
McCulloch, a striker, began his senior career with Third Lanark, whom he joined from junior side Shotts United in 1932. After two years at Cathkin Park, he was signed by Hearts for £530, moving east at the same time as his Thirds teammate John MacKenzie. His first season at Tynecastle was notable, as he scored 38 times (at an average of a goal per game) to top the First Division scoring charts. Such a goal-scoring ratio helped Hearts to both a third-place finish and increased attendances, although Double-winners Rangers proved too strong in the Scottish Cup semi-finals. Costs incurred by work to improve Tynecastle's facilities and capacity were proving a financial millstone and in November 1935, the Hearts board indicated that certain players were available for transfer. McCulloch was by this stage one of five Scotland players on the club's books, having made his debut against Wales a year earlier, and an obvious transfer target. After numerous expressions of interest from English clubs, McCulloch and international teammate Alex Massie were sold to offset the debt, McCulloch joining London side Brentford for a club record incoming fee of £6,000.

McCulloch continued his prodigious scoring rate with the Bees and by the end of the 1938–39 season he had scored total of 178 goals from 234 league (English and Scottish) games. He also remained a Scotland regular, earning a further 6 caps during which he scored 3 goals, including 2 against Czechoslovakia in December 1937.

McCulloch was transferred to Derby County for £9,500 in October 1938 but his time with his new club was disrupted by the Second World War, which began while he was at the peak of his abilities and curtailed his international career. During the conflict he "guested" for no less than six clubs, military demands ensuring footballers such as him were seldom resident in one location for an extended period of time. McCulloch's temporary sides were: Falkirk, Brentford, Aldershot, Chelsea, Bournemouth & Boscombe Athletic and Swansea Town. At the war's conclusion he signed for Derby's rivals Leicester City before finishing his career with non-league Bath City and Irish side Waterford United.

While with Waterford McCulloch assisted with coaching and in 1951 he returned to Scotland as manager of Alloa Athletic, a position he held for one season.

Honours 
 Brentford Hall of Fame

References

External links 
 
 Scotland statistics at londonhearts.com
 Hearts statistics at londonhearts.com

1912 births
1979 deaths
Scottish footballers
Scotland international footballers
Third Lanark A.C. players
Heart of Midlothian F.C. players
Brentford F.C. players
Derby County F.C. players
Leicester City F.C. players
Bath City F.C. players
Scottish Football League players
League of Ireland players
Scottish football managers
Alloa Athletic F.C. managers
Waterford F.C. players
Scottish Football League representative players
Scottish Football League managers
Hamilton Academical F.C. wartime guest players
Falkirk F.C. wartime guest players
Brentford F.C. wartime guest players
Motherwell F.C. wartime guest players
Aldershot F.C. wartime guest players
Chelsea F.C. wartime guest players
AFC Bournemouth wartime guest players
Swansea Town A.F.C. wartime guest players
Association football forwards
Footballers from Hamilton, South Lanarkshire
Scottish expatriate sportspeople in Ireland
Scottish expatriate footballers
Expatriate association footballers in the Republic of Ireland